The Škoda Garde (Type 743) is a rear-engined, rear-wheel drive coupé that was produced by Czechoslovakian manufacturer AZNP between 1981 and July 1984. It was initially manufactured in Kvasiny from September 1981 to May 1982 - with production moving to Bratislava in May 1982 – becoming the first mass-produced car in Slovakia.

The Garde is a 2-door coupé derived from the Škoda 120 LS 4-door saloon, powered by the same 1.2-litre (1174 cc) engine producing .

References

External links 
Skoda Vintage website

Garde
Cars introduced in 1981
1980s cars
Rear-engined vehicles
Cars discontinued in 1984